Katrina Weidman (born March 2, 1983) is an American paranormal investigator who began her career appearing on the A&E series Paranormal State (2007–2011) while a student at Pennsylvania State University. She has since co-starred with Nick Groff on Paranormal Lockdown (2016–2019), and Portals to Hell (2019–present) with Jack Osbourne.

Career
Weidman attended Pennsylvania State University, where she joined the PRS, whose investigations were the basis of the A&E series Paranormal State. Weidman worked as the PRS's case manager between 2006 and 2011.

In 2016, Weidman began appearing with Nick Groff on the Destination America series Paranormal Lockdown, in which the duo spend 72 hours inside a haunted location with only their camera man and no access to the outside world. Beginning in 2019, Weidman co-starred with Jack Osbourne on the series Portals to Hell.

Television appearances
Paranormal State (2007–2011, 85 episodes)
Paranormal Lockdown (2016–2019, 48 episodes)
Portals to Hell (2019–present, 39 episodes)

Filmography

References

External links
Official site

1983 births
People from Bucks County, Pennsylvania
Paranormal investigators
Pennsylvania State University alumni
Living people